Since Arizona's admission to the Union in February 1912, it has participated in 28 United States presidential elections. In the 1912 presidential election, the incumbent president William Howard Taft finished fourth in Arizona, receiving just 12.75% of the popular vote. In the 1936 presidential election, the Democratic Party's candidate Franklin D. Roosevelt won Arizona, defeating the Republican Party's candidate Alf Landon by 42.92%, which remains the largest margin of victory in the state's history. Ross Perot, the independent candidate in the 1992 presidential election, received the highest vote share (23.79%) ever won by a third-party candidate in Arizona.

Joe Biden, the Democratic Party's candidate in the 2020 presidential election, won Arizona, defeating the incumbent president Donald Trump by a close margin of 0.3%. During the 2021 joint session of the Congress for ascertaining the electoral votes, 69 members objected to the certification of electoral votes of Arizona, asserting that "they were not, under all of the known circumstances, regularly given". The objection failed by a vote of 6–93 in the Senate and 121–303 in the House of Representatives. However, Trump's campaign has launched various post-election lawsuits challenging the results. As of 2022, no Republican has won the presidency without carrying Arizona since its statehood in 1912, but Democrats have won the presidency without carrying the state six times, most recently Barack Obama in 2012.

Since the 1952 presidential election, Arizona has been considered a stronghold state for the Republican Party, as it won Arizona in all elections since except 1996 and 2020. However, recent political realignment has led some to consider Arizona as a swing state.

Presidential elections

Graph

See also
 Elections in Arizona
 List of United States presidential election results by state

Notes

References

Works cited